Coleophora argentifimbriata is a moth of the family Coleophoridae that can be found in Algeria and Turkey.

Larvae possibly feed on Trifolium species.

References

External links

argentifimbriata
Moths of Africa
Moths of Asia
Moths described in 1907